Pechenga Station is the rural locality (a Station) in Pechengsky District of Murmansk Oblast, Russia. The village is located beyond the Arctic circle.

The railway station is located at a branch of the Oktyabrskaya Railway. It has been the northernmost railway station in Russia connected to the main network.

References

Rural localities in Murmansk Oblast